House of Love is the eleventh studio album by Pop singer Amy Grant, released in 1994.

The album is the follow-up to her quintuple-platinum 1991 release Heart in Motion. Although House of Love sold less than half of what its predecessor sold, it similarly combines pop music with Christian values. "Lucky One" was the album's biggest hit at No. 18 Pop and No. 2 Adult Contemporary in the U.S., followed by the title song and a remake of Joni Mitchell's "Big Yellow Taxi". "Say You'll Be Mine" also was a UK Top 50 hit. When it was released in 1994, House of Love was the biggest initial release in Christian music history, shipping almost a half million copies on its first day alone.

Copies of this album sold in Europe, Australia, and Japan feature the additional track "Politics of Kissing". Some of the album's other tracks garnered more notice later on when covered by other artists. "The Power" (written by Tommy Sims and Judson Spence) is featured on Cher's 1998 album Believe, and Vanessa Williams had an AC hit with her version of "Oh How the Years Go By" (written by Simon Climie and Will Jennings) from her 1997 album Next.

In 2007, House of Love was reissued and digitally remastered by Grant's new record label, EMI/Sparrow Records. The remastered edition is labeled with a "Digitally Remastered" logo in the 'gutter' on the CD front.

Track listing

Personnel 

 Amy Grant – lead vocals, backing vocals (1, 2, 8, 11)
 Keith Thomas – acoustic piano (1, 2, 3, 9), synthesizers (1–4, 9, 11), bass programming (1, 2, 3, 9), drum programming (1, 3), electric piano (4), additional synthesizer programming (5), percussion programming (9, 11)
 Phil Madeira – Hammond B3 organ (4, 11)
 Michael Omartian – keyboards (6, 7, 8, 10), drum sequencing (8), horn arrangements (8)
 Tom Hemby – keyboards (10), guitars (10), drum programming (10)
 Jerry McPherson – electric guitars (1, 3, 4, 11), guitars (7)
 Scott Denté – acoustic guitars (1, 11)
 Will Owsley – acoustic guitars (1, 5)
 Dann Huff – electric guitars (2), guitars (6, 8), acoustic guitar (9)
 Kenny Greenberg – acoustic guitars (4), electric guitars (4)
 Jerry Douglas – dobro (5)
 Brent Rowan – guitars (7), mandolin (7)
 Gary Chapman – lap steel guitar (7), backing vocals (7)
 Tommy Sims – bass guitar (1, 4, 11), synthesizers (5), bass programming (5), drum programming (5), backing vocals (5)
 Danny O'Lannerghty – bass guitar (7)
 Mark Hammond – drum programming (1, 2, 3), drums (9)
 Chad Cromwell – drums (4, 11)
 Chris McHugh – drums (6, 7)
 Terry McMillan – percussion (4)
 Eric Darken – percussion (7)
 Mark Douthit – saxophone (8), soprano saxophone (10)
 Doug Moffett – saxophone (8)
 Mike Haynes – trumpet (8)
 George Tidwell – trumpet (8)
 Mark O'Connor – violin (11)
 Ronn Huff – string arrangements and conductor (5)
 Carl Gorodetzsky – string contractor (5)
 The Nashville String Machine – strings (5)
 Lisa Keith – backing vocals (1)
 Athena Cage – background vocals (1, 3)
 Ada Dyer – backing vocals (2–5)
 Judson Spence – backing vocals (2–5), acoustic guitars (5)
 Audrey Wheeler – backing vocals (2–5)
 Vince Gill – guest vocals (4)
 Ashley Cleveland – backing vocals (6, 7, 8)
 Donna McElroy – backing vocals (6, 8)
 Michael Mellett – backing vocals (6, 7, 8)
 Lisa Bevill – backing vocals (7) 
 Chris Rodriguez – backing vocals (8)
 Beverly Darnall – choir contractor (11)
 Leann Albrecht – adult choir (11)
 Jackie Cusic – adult choir (11)
 Beverly Darnall – adult choir (11)
 Lisa Glasgow – adult choir (11)
 Gail Farrell – adult choir (11)
 Sarah Huffman – adult choir (11)
 Ellen Musick – adult choir (11)
 Kristine Stroupe – adult choir (11)
 Leah Taylor – adult choir (11)
 Melodie Tunney – adult choir (11)
 Butch Curry – adult choir (11)
 Rick Gibson – adult choir (11)
 David Holloway – adult choir (11)
 Michael Mellett – adult choir (11)
 Donny Monk – adult choir (11)
 Guy Penrod – adult choir (11)
 Gary Robinson – adult choir (11)
 Beau Stroupe – adult choir (11)
 Scott Williamson – adult choir (11)
 Chris Willis – adult choir (11)
 Katy Dunham – children choir (11)
 Aubrey Hunt – children choir (11)
 Shannon Love – children choir (11)
 Mary Catherine Musick – children choir (11)
 Isaac Darnall – children choir (11)
 Lance High – children choir (11)
 Asher Larrison – children choir (11)
 Trevor Matheison – children choir (11)

Production

 Keith Thomas – producer (1–5, 9, 11)
 Michael Omartian – producer (6, 7, 8, 10)
 Amy Grant – executive producer
 Michael Blanton – executive producer
 Brown Bannister – executive producer
 Todd Moore – production coordinator (1–5, 9, 11)
 Suzy Martinez – production coordinator (6, 7, 8, 10)
 Bill Whittington – engineer, mixing (1–5, 9, 11)
 Terry Christian – engineer (6, 7, 8, 10), mixing (7, 8, 10)
 Mick Guzauski – mixing (6)
 Shawn McLean – assistant engineer (1–5, 9, 11)
 Greg Parker – assistant engineer (1–5, 9, 11)
 Scott Link – assistant engineer (6, 7, 8, 10)
 Keith Robichaux – assistant engineer (6, 7, 8, 10)
 Mark J. Capps – assistant engineer (6, 7, 8, 10)
 John Dickson – assistant engineer (6, 7, 8, 10)
 James Dineen – additional engineering (6, 7, 8, 10)
 Danny Duncan – MIDI assistant (5)
 Stephen Marcussen – mastering
 Norman Moore – art direction, design
 Richard Frankel – art direction
 Albert Sanchez – photography

Charts

Weekly charts

Year-end charts

End-of-decade charts

Certifications and sales

References 

1994 albums
Amy Grant albums
Albums produced by Michael Omartian
A&M Records albums